Taxus sumatrana is an evergreen shrub and one of the eight species of the yew.  It is found in a number of countries, including Afghanistan, Tibet, Nepal, Sumatra, Philippines, Vietnam, India, Burma, Taiwan, and China, and is known both as the Taiwan yew and the Chinese yew. It is typically found at heights ranging from 400–3,100 m in subtropical forest and on  highland ridges.  It is a protected species in Taroko National Park in Taiwan.

Appearance
Taxus sumatrana is a wide trunked, bushy tree that grows to an average height of 14 m. Its leaves are 1.2–2.7 cm long and 2–2.5 mm wide, and grow in two ranks along the branches, abruptly spiralling into an apex at the tip, with a pale yellow-green colour on top, and light green underneath. The Chinese yew has fleshy seeds that ripen into a red colour, and a grey-red bark which exfoliates in irregular 1.5 mm thick flakes and leaves scars on the trunk that appear yellow quickly after cutting.

Uses
The oil used to mark a red tilaka on the forehead of a Brahmin is made by mixing oil with the bark from this tree. Chinese yews are also used for clogs, whip handles, bed frames and bows.

References

External links

  Information, pictures

sumatrana
Trees of Afghanistan
Trees of China
Flora of tropical Asia